Lintzford is a small village on the border of County Durham and Tyne and Wear, England.

Situated on the River Derwent in the countryside near the town of Consett, Lintzford is renowned for its beauty, derived from nearby streams, forests and open fields, and the typical English cottage houses that surround it.

Its population was approximately 200 according to the last census. It is located approximately 280 miles north of London  and is southwest of Rowlands Gill.

External links

Villages in County Durham
Villages in Tyne and Wear